TAH, Tah or tah may refer to:
 
 Taiwan Adventist Hospital, Taipei
 Total artificial heart
 Tahitian language ISO 639 code
 Whitegrass Airport, Tanna, Vanuatu, IATA code
 Jonathan Tah, German footballer
 Trans-African Highway network, Transcontinental roads project in Africa
 Tah, Morocco
 Alternative English name of the Arabic letter